Two destroyers of the Imperial Japanese Navy were named Shiratsuyu:

 , a  launched in 1906 and stricken in 1928
 , a  launched in 1935 and sunk in 1944

Imperial Japanese Navy ship names
Japanese Navy ship names